The TELECOM Nancy (formerly École supérieure d'informatique et applications de Lorraine or ÉSIAL) is a grande école of engineering created in 1990. It is associated with the University of Lorraine. TELECOM Nancy is a school associated with the Institut Mines-Télécom. It is the only school of generalised engineering studies in IT and digital sciences and technologies accredited by the Commission des Titres de l’Ingénieur (CTI - Engineer Qualification Committee) in the Greater East of France.

It was created in 1990 and is based in Nancy, France.

The standard curriculum is a three-year program (after two years of preparation) resulting in the French Diplôme d'Ingénieur, which is equivalent to a Master's degree of the European Higher Education Area.

Educational programmes 
TELECOM Nancy is aimed at producing engineers well-versed in the principles of computing science and automation, and experts at integrating computing hardware and software into their products: information systems engineering, networking engineering, software engineering, telecommunications engineering, and systems engineering. Studies are organized into four possible themes and students (at the end of the first common year) have to choose a field they want to learn more about:

 IL - Ingénierie Logicielle Software engineering
 SIE - Systèmes d'Information d'Entreprise (Enterprise Information Systems)
 TRS - Télécommunications, Réseaux et Systèmes / Services Telecommunication
 LE - Logiciels Embarqués Embedded software
 IAMD - Masse de Données Big Data

At the end of each year, TELECOM Nancy students have to do an internship in order to practise their knowledge and be part of the Working world:
 First year: a one-month internship in a non-computer science field, in order to discover the everyday life in a firm.
 Second year: a two-month internship in a computer development field.
 Third year: a six-month engineer internship.

Also, the third year can happen in another school or university. You can use a few networks the school is connected to:
 ERASMUS, giving access to many schools in Europe.
 CREPUQ, giving access to Canada's schools.
 Or simply stay in the network of schools that are partners of the Université de Lorraine, as is TELECOM Nancy.

Teaching 
Most of TELECOM Nancy teachers are researchers, mainly in these three laboratories:

 the LORIA (Laboratoire lorrain de recherche en informatique et ses applications), associated with the INRIA Lorraine (Institut national de recherche en informatique et en automatique) since 1986.
 the CRAN (Centre de recherche en automatique de Nancy), associated with CNRS (Centre national de la recherche scientifique) for more than ten years.
 the IECN (Institut Élie Cartan de Nancy) associated with CNRS and the INRIA Lorraine

Notable alumni 
 Guillaume Rozier, a French engineer, data aggregator, and consultant in data science

External links 
 TELECOM Nancy (Official Website)
 LORIA
 INRIA
 CRAN
 CNRS
 IECN

See also 
 Education in France
 Grandes écoles
 Concours commun Mines-Ponts

Nancy
Nancy, France
Educational institutions established in 1990
University of Lorraine
1990 establishments in France